G-Funk Classics, Vol. 1 & 2 is the debut studio album by American singer and rapper Nate Dogg. The album was originally to be released through Death Row Records in January 1997, but the album was shelved due to legal problems at Death Row Records, and he wasn't able to release it until the summer of 1998. By that time, the popularity of West Coast hip hop had greatly diminished and the album only managed to make it to number 58 on the Billboard 200 and number 20 on the Top R&B/Hip-Hop Albums. The album did produce four singles with two top 40 singles, however, "Never Leave Me Alone", which was released on October 22, 1996 through Death Row Records and peaked at number 33 on the Billboard Hot 100.

"Nobody Does It Better", which became his biggest hit as a solo artist, peaking at number 18 on the Hot 100, "These Days", released through Death Row Records and "I Don't Wanna Hurt No More", released in 1998 through Breakaway. The song "These Days" was previously featured on the first disc of soundtrack of the movie Gang Related, released in 1997 through Death Row Records and the song was released as a 12" promo on the B-side on 2Pac's single "Lost Souls", also on the soundtrack. It also had a release in 1997 as a promo version through Death Row Records  The track listing of the original print included an error, "Crazy, Dangerous" was credited as featuring Big Syke. The LP sold around 33,000 copies in the first week.
The first volume was recorded during his tenure at Death Row Records, while the second volume was recorded after.

Background
The album was first advertised by Death Row Records four years prior to its release.

Track listing

Charts

Samples
"She's Strange" contains an interpolation of "She's Strange" performed by Cameo.

References

1998 debut albums
Nate Dogg albums
G-funk albums
Albums produced by Daz Dillinger
Albums produced by L.T. Hutton
Albums produced by Soopafly
Albums produced by Teddy Riley
Albums produced by Johnny "J"
Albums produced by Warren G